Coffee shop may refer to:

Shops and establishments
 Coffeehouse or café, an establishment where coffee is served
 Coffeeshop (Netherlands), a place where cannabis products are sold and consumed
 Coffee shop, in the U.S., a casual, popular-priced restaurant similar to a diner
 Kopi tiam, a version of the coffee shops common in Singapore and Malaysia
 The Coffee Shop (Union Square), a defunct American restaurant

Art, entertainment, and media

TV
 Coffee Shop (Urban TV), Ugandan TV series

Music
 "Coffee Shop" (B.A.P song)
 "Coffee Shop" (Red Hot Chili Peppers song)
 "Coffee Shop" (Yung Joc song)
 "Coffee Shop Soundtrack" (All Time Low song)

See also
 Cafe (disambiguation)
 Coffeehouse (disambiguation)